"Jimmy Dean" is a 1989 song performed by the Swedish band Troll.

Chart performance 
The song reached #1 on Swedish Trackslistan on January 6 1990 and stayed on top for another week. The song also topped the singles chart on February 7 1990 for one week.

Cover versions in Finland and Poland 
In 1995, Finnish female pop duo CatCat brought out a Finnish-language version of the song, entitled "Piirtelet mun sydämeen (You draw in my heart)". This version was renewed in 2017 when the duo re-recorded the song, changing its form from pop to club music.

In 1998, Forte, a Polish duo, released a Polish-language version of the song, entitled "Monte Carlo i Ty (Monte Carlo and You)". In this version, the sound has been changed to be closer to Eurodance music, the melody of the verses has been changed and an English rap part has been added. The cover in the Polish language version was the title track of the Forte duo cassette and album.

References 

Swedish pop songs
1989 singles
Songs written by Alexander Bard
Songs written by Tim Norell
Songs written by Ola Håkansson
1989 songs
Songs about actors
Cultural depictions of James Dean